
This is a list of the 35 players who earned their 2007 European Tour card through Q School in 2006.

 2007 European Tour rookie

2007 results

* European Tour rookie in 2007
T = Tied 
 The player retained his European Tour card for 2008 (finished inside the top 117, or won).
 The player did not retain his European Tour Tour card for 2008, but retained conditional status (finished between 118-149).
 The player did not retain his European Tour card for 2008 (finished outside the top 149).

Winners on the European Tour in 2007

Runners-up on the European Tour in 2007

See also
2006 Challenge Tour graduates

European Tour
European Tour Qualifying School Graduates